Katana is the name given to a Ricoh photocopier. It is a high volume machine that is able to copy at speeds of up to 135 pages per minute, while the slowest Katana copier can copy at 90 copies per minute.  It is a black and white machine but has a color scanner fitted to it. It can be used as both a photocopier and printer at the same time.

See also
Ricoh
Photocopier
Printing
Multifunction printer

References

Photocopiers
Ricoh products